Operation Cheese was an intelligence operation carried out by the British Special Operations Executive (SOE) in Norway during World War II. Key persons were Odd Starheim and Gunvald Tomstad, who established radio communications with UK and developed an intelligence network in Southern Norway. The radio station was located at Tomstad's farm Helle, three kilometers outside the town Flekkefjord.

References

Literature

Special Operations Executive operations
Military history of Norway during World War II